Us in the U.S. is a 2013 Italian comedy film directed by Carlo Vanzina.

Cast
Vincenzo Salemme as Antonio
Ambra Angiolini as Angela
Ricky Memphis as Nino
Anna Foglietta as Carmen
Giovanni Vernia as Michele
Maurizio Mattioli as Oreste Bracchi
Andrea Pittorino as Roby
Paolo Bessegato as Notary Garbarino
Daniela Piperno as the psychiatrist

References

External links

2013 films
Films directed by Carlo Vanzina
2010s Italian-language films
2013 comedy films
Italian comedy films
2010s Italian films
Foreign films set in the United States